Douglas Tyndall Wright,  (October 4, 1927 – May 21, 2020) was a Canadian civil engineer, civil servant, and university administrator.

Wright was born in Toronto, Ontario, the son of Etta Frances Tyndall and George Charles Wright. He received a B.A.Sc. from the University of Toronto in 1949, a Master of Science degree in 1952 from the University of Illinois Urbana-Champaign, and a Ph.D. from Trinity College, Cambridge in 1954. In 1954, he joined the Department of Civil Engineering at Queen's University becoming Associate Professor by 1958. In 1958, he became a Professor of Civil Engineering at the University of Waterloo. He was Chairman of the Department of Civil Engineering from 1958 to 1963 and was Dean of the Faculty of Engineering from 1959 to 1966.

From 1967 to 1972, he was the Chairman of the Committee on University Affairs for the Province of Ontario. From 1969 to 1972, he was the Chairman of the Commission on Post Secondary Education in Ontario. From 1972 to 1979, he was Deputy Provincial Secretary for Social Development and from 1979 to 1980, he was Deputy Minister of Culture and Recreation. From 1981 to 1993, he was the President, and Vice-Chancellor of the University of Waterloo. From 1995 to July 2007, he was a member of the Board of Directors of Research in Motion, Bell Canada, Meloche Monnix Insurance, London Life Insurance Company, Perimeter Institute, Stratford Festival, McMichael Canadian Art Collection and many more. 

In 1991, he was made an Officer of the Order of Canada. In 1993, he was made a Knight (chevalier) in France's Ordre National du Mérite. In 1995, he received the Sir John Kennedy Medal from the Engineering Institute of Canada. He was a Fellow of the Canadian Academy of Engineering and of the Engineering Institute of Canada. He received honorary degrees from Carleton University, Brock University, Memorial University of Newfoundland, Concordia University, Northeastern University, Strathclyde University, Université de Technologie de Compiègne, Université de Sherbrooke, Queen's University, McMaster University, University of Toronto, and the University of Waterloo.

He died on May 21, 2020.

See also
 List of University of Waterloo people

References

External links

Dr. D.T. Wright - President 1981-1993, President Emeritus 

1927 births
2020 deaths
Alumni of Trinity College, Cambridge
Canadian academics in engineering
20th-century Canadian civil servants
Canadian university and college faculty deans
Presidents of the University of Waterloo
Officers of the Order of Canada
Fellows of the Engineering Institute of Canada
People from Toronto
University of Illinois Urbana-Champaign alumni
University of Toronto alumni
Directors of BlackBerry Limited